Péter Rusorán (11 April 1940 – 14 February 2012) was a Hungarian swimmer, water polo player and later water polo coach. As a player, he won the Olympic Games gold medal in 1964 and the bronze in 1960 and also obtained the Universiade title in 1965. As a coach, Rusorán won a number of national league titles both in Hungary and abroad and also triumphed on two occasions in the most prestigious continental competition, the European Champions Cup.

Career
Rusorán was born in Budapest and began swimming and playing water polo at the age of nine by Fáklya Opera. In 1952 he switched to Vörös Meteor, and in 1961 to Csepel Autó. In 1969 he moved to Vasas SC, where he finished his playing career in 1972. On club level his biggest achievement is a Hungarian Cup title from 1971.

Rusorán played 103 times for the Hungarian water polo team between 1959 and 1968, and won the bronze medal at the 1960 Summer Olympics. He played two matches in the tournament and scored six goals. Four years later he was a member of the Hungarian team which won the gold medal in the 1964 Olympics. Rusorán contributed with eight goals in six matches to the success, and became the best Hungarian scorer of the championship. In 1965 he also won the Universiade held in his hometown Budapest.

Coaching
Following his retirement from professional sports, Rusorán took the head coaching position of Vasas SC and led them to seven Hungarian Championship titles. On the continental level he won two European Champions Cups in 1980 and 1985, and the Cup Winners' Cup in 1986. He had a short spell in Iran, where he managed the Iranian national team, and he also coached the Hungarian national team from 1983 to 1985, during which period Hungary won a silver medal at the 1983 World Championship.

Rusorán later coached Budapest-based Tungsram SC, and from the early nineties he worked abroad: first in Germany with record champions Wasserfreunde Spandau 04, then in Greece, where he coached Ethnikos Piraeus and finally in Switzerland with SVVC Morgan.

Retirement
After quitting water polo, Rusorán settled in Paloznak, a little village in the Bakony mountains. For his sporting achievements and his work for the village community he was awarded the honorary citizenship of Paloznak in 2010. He died on 14 February 2012 at the age of 71.

See also
 Hungary men's Olympic water polo team records and statistics
 List of Olympic champions in men's water polo
 List of Olympic medalists in water polo (men)

References

External links
 

1940 births
2012 deaths
Water polo players from Budapest
Hungarian male water polo players
Hungarian water polo coaches
Olympic water polo players of Hungary
Water polo players at the 1960 Summer Olympics
Water polo players at the 1964 Summer Olympics
Olympic gold medalists for Hungary
Olympic bronze medalists for Hungary
Olympic medalists in water polo
Vasas SC water polo players
Hungarian expatriates in Iran
Hungarian expatriates in Greece
Hungarian expatriates in Germany
Hungarian expatriate sportspeople in Switzerland
Ethnikos WPC
Medalists at the 1964 Summer Olympics
Medalists at the 1960 Summer Olympics
Universiade medalists in water polo
Universiade gold medalists for Hungary